Dancer is a 1991 Indian Bollywood film. It stars Akshay Kumar, Mohini, Kirti Singh in lead roles. The music was composed by Anand-Milind.

Plot
Raja (Akshay Kumar), a very much talented and struggling dancer lives a poor lifestyle with his childhood friend Dattu (Laxmikant Berde) & Dattu's sister Radha (Kirti Singh), who loves Raja from her childhood. While Raja dances and sings, Dattu plays drums. When Raja was a child, his father Suraj (Anand Balraj) was killed and his mother Malti (Anjana Mumtaz) was sentenced for the murder, both of them were renowned artists. One day he sees an advertisement to perform on a famous auditorium. He tries to participate there, but not allowed firstly, then he takes part desperately & wins the first prize, must to the chargin of the former random first prize winner Manish (Mohnish Behl), who now becomes his enemy. On the other side, Manish's former dance partner Priya (Mohini) falls in love with Raja, not only for he is talented, also for he is a very good human being. This angers Manish much more & now Manish tries to kill Raja & arrested. Soon, Raja and Priya discovers that they're childhood lovers of each other. Priya becomes Raja's dance partner & soon they become famous all over India, with the help of her father Rai Bahadur Brij Bhushan Sharma (Dalip Tahil). In the meantime, Malti comes out of the jail after finishing her sentence. Now, Raja confesses his love for Priya to his mother, to which she agrees and wants to meet Priya's father on Priya's birthday. On that day Malti meets with Brij Bhushan, who is none other than that stranger, who attacked to rape her once and killed Suraj when he was trying to save her.  Malti walks away from Brij Bhushan, who calls back yelling forget the past, see the happiness of their children and gives a blank cheque. But Malti tells the cheque of the bank is nothing for the sorrow filled bank of hers and shouts in front of everyone that Brij gave her cheque to stop their alliance, the entire party audience speaks Brij Bhushan as a wrong person that annoys him, he raises his hand to beat but Raja gets furious and leaves the party with his mother. Next day Priya tells Raja by phone to meet near temple that overheard by the friend of Brij Bhushan. Near temple when Raja embrace Priya, that person hits him unconscious, now Raja is applied electric shock and Brij Bhushan tells Priya to marry Manish, Priya finally agrees to avoid further torture for Raja. Raja escapes from the room and enters the dance programme, the same time Radha, along with Priya escapes from her father's custody. At last, Priya and Raja dances for the stage programme. At the end of the program, Brij Bhushan comes with his rowdies, fight starts and finally Brij Bhushan gunpoint Malti for which Raja gets hit down by rowdies and Malti this time reveals his father killer is Brij Bhushan, this rises Raja who fights everybody and kills Brij Bhushan at the end of fight by hit him onto electric wire board. Film ends with Raja and Priya marry as per Radha's wish, who got shot from Brij Bhushan earlier while avoiding bullet injury to Raja.

Cast
 Akshay Kumar as Raja
 Mohini as Priya
 Kirti Singh as Radha
 Mohnish Behl as Manish
 Dalip Tahil as Rai Bahadur Brij Bhushan Sharma
 Anjana Mumtaz as Malti
 Anand Balraj as Suraj
 Laxmikant Berde as Dattu

Music

References

External links

1991 films
1990s Hindi-language films
Indian dance films
Films scored by Anand–Milind